Veronavelifer sorbinii is an extinct sailfin moonfish from the Lutetian epoch of the Monte Bolca lagerstatten.

Veliferidae
Eocene fish
Fossil taxa described in 1990
Fossils of Italy